Tank Commander is a video game developed by Big Red Software and published by Domark for DOS.

Gameplay
Tank Commander is a game that features modem and network play.

Reception

Next Generation reviewed the PC version of the game, rating it two stars out of five, and stated that "Outside of the game's nice visuals, Tank Commander is nowhere near as good as MicroProse's M1 Tank Platoon, a much earlier tank sim that remains the market's best." Ted Chapman of Computer Game Review dubbed it "fiendishly addictive".

Reviews
PC Gamer Vol. 2 No. 8 (1995 August)
Computer Gaming World (Jul, 1995)
PC Games - May, 1995
MikroBitti - Aug, 1995
PC Player - May, 1995
Pelit - May, 1995
PC Team (May, 1995)
Power Play (Apr, 1995)

References

1995 video games
Big Red Software games
Domark games
DOS games
DOS-only games
Multiplayer video games
Tank simulation video games
Third-person shooters
Video games developed in the United Kingdom